The Democratic League of Dardania was a political party in Kosovo. The Democratic League of Dardania was established in January 2007 by the former Speaker of the Assembly of Kosovo Nexhat Daci following his unsuccessful bid to become leader of the Democratic League of Kosovo. It was a conservative party and the second largest right-wing party in Kosovo in its time.

The leader of the Democratic League of Dardania was Nexhat Daci, the deputy leaders are Besa Gaxherri, Xhemajl Hyseni, Naser Rugova whereas the Secretary General is Lulëzim Zeneli. The party was initially named the Democratic League, but later Dardania, the ancient name for Kosovo, was added to avoid confusion with the Democratic League of Kosovo.

On April 30, 2015, its leader announced that his party would merge back into the Democratic League of Kosovo.

See also
Democratic League of Kosovo
Democratic Party of Kosovo
Alliance for the Future of Kosovo
Reformist Party ORA
New Kosovo Alliance

References

External links
Democratic League of Dardania The official website

Conservative parties in Kosovo
Defunct political parties in Kosovo
Liberal parties in Kosovo
Political parties established in 2007